Mafia is a 2002 Egyptian action film directed by Sherif Arafa.

Cast 
 Ahmed El Sakka - Hussain / Tarek Zidan
 Mostafa Shaban - Hossam
 Mona Zaki - Mariam
  - Rafat

References

External links 

2002 action films
2002 films
Egyptian action films
2000s Arabic-language films